Fruzsina Dávid-Azari (née Azari) (born 29 June 1989) is a retired Hungarian handballer who most recently played for MTK Budapest in right wing position.

Achievements
EHF Cup
Winner: 2016
Nemzeti Bajnokság I:
Bronze Medalist: 2007
Magyar Kupa:
Bronze Medalist: 2011

Personal life 
She is married to former basketball player Kornél Dávid. She gave birth to their first son, Barnabás Dalton in July 2017. Their second son, Soma was born in 2021.

References

External links
 Fruzsina Azari career statistics at Worldhandball

1989 births
Living people
Sportspeople from Dunaújváros
Hungarian female handball players
Fehérvár KC players